The PBA Tour Playoffs is an annual invitational event on the PBA Tour in North America that debuted in the 2019 season. After two years as a 24-player tournament, the event has been set up in a 16-player bracket-style format since 2021.

Tournament Structure
PBA Tour Playoffs participants are chosen and seeded based on points earned in qualifying to-date tournaments of the current season. (For 2019, this included 13 events, from the PBA Hall of Fame Classic through the USBC Masters; for 2020, this included 12 events due to the cancellation of the USBC Masters.) PBA Tour points are awarded on a tier system, as follows:

 Tier 3: PBA short format or limited field tournaments (2500 points for first, and descending thereafter)
 Tier 2: PBA standard tournaments with a fully open field (double the points of Tier 3 events)
 Tier 1: PBA major tournaments (triple the points of Tier 3 events)

For 2019 and 2020, the top eight players in points received byes into the second round (round of 16). The #9 through #24 seeds competed in single-elimination matches (one standard ten-frame game each) to determine who advanced to the second round.

For 2019, Round 2 and all subsequent rounds featured double-elimination matches, also known as the "race to two points". Any player winning both games in a match earns two points and advances to the next round. If the match is split one game each, the players bowl a 9th/10th frame roll-off to determine who wins the second point and the right to advance. If the 9th/10th frame roll-off results in a tie, a one-ball, sudden death roll-off is used until a winner is determined. For 2020, only the championship finals used the race to two points format. All other rounds were single-elimination matches.

The PBA Players Committee originally voted to make the playoffs a non-title event, citing the low number of games bowled as the primary reason. However, on December 6, 2019, the PBA announced that the winner of the 2019 PBA Playoffs would retroactively be awarded a PBA Tour title, and that the winner of the 2020 PBA Playoffs and subsequent events will be credited with a PBA title. As of 2020, winners also receive a WWE championship belt, as part of a cross-promotion with WWE wrestling, which is also broadcast on Fox Sports (current home of the PBA).

Since 2021, the PBA Playoffs feature a 16-player field rather than a 24-player field. All PBA Playoffs matches are double-elimination ("race to two points") except for the final match, which uses a "race to three points" format. Players bowl a maximum of four games, with the first player to win three games earning the championship. If the match is split two games each, the players bowl a 9th/10th frame roll-off for the third point and the title.

Tournament history

Past winners

2022 event
The 2022 Kia PBA Playoffs features a 16-player field, and runs from Sunday, April 10 to Sunday, May 15. The 16 players qualified and were seeded for the 2022 Playoffs based on points earned in the five majors and the eight standard 2022 title events through April 3. The tournament has a $300,000 prize fund with a $100,000 first prize. All 2022 PBA Playoffs matches are double-elimination ("race to two points") except for the final match, which uses a "race to three points" format.

Round 1 (round of 16)
All matches until the finals are a race-to-two points format. Competitors who win both games earn two points and advance to the Quarterfinals. Any match resulting in a 1–1 tie is broken by a 9th/10th frame rolloff.

Winners (bold type) advance to the quarterfinals; losers earn $5,000.

Sunday, April 10

(1) Jason Belmonte 1 vs. (16)  Bill O'Neill 2

Game 1: O'Neill wins 247–227
Game 2: Belmonte wins 258–213
Rolloff: O'Neill wins 59–48

(8) Sean Rash 0 vs. (9) Kyle Troup 2

Game 1: Troup wins 266–218
Game 2: Troup wins 266–195

(4) Dominic Barrett 2 vs. (13) Packy Hanrahan 1

Game 1: Barrett wins 280–226
Game 2: Hanrahan wins 255–233
Rolloff: Barrett wins 59–38

(5) Kristopher Prather 2 vs. (12) Brad Miller 0

Game 1: Prather wins 210–205
Game 2: Prather wins 258–212

Saturday, April 16

(2) Anthony Simonsen 0 vs. (15) Shawn Maldonado 2

Game 1: Maldonado wins 204–192
Game 2: Maldonado wins 267–174

(7) Jakob Butturff 0 vs. (10) A. J. Johnson 2

Game 1: Johnson wins 270–232
Game 2: Johnson wins 245–224

Sunday, April 17

(3) E. J. Tackett 1 vs. (14) Jesper Svensson 2

Game 1: Svensson wins 258–223
Game 2: Tackett wins 242–227
Rolloff: Svensson wins 38–24

(6) Tommy Jones 2 vs. (11) Kyle Sherman 0

Game 1: Jones wins 237–198
Game 2: Jones wins 233–221

Round 2 (round of 8)

Quarterfinals

Winners (bold type) advance to the semifinals; losers earn $12,500.

Sunday, April 24

(9) Kyle Troup 2 vs. (16) Bill O'Neill 0
Game 1: Troup wins 278–236
Game 2: Troup wins 205–202

(5) Kristopher Prather 2 vs. (4) Dominic Barrett 0
Game 1: Prather wins 279–248
Game 2: Prather wins 278–268

Sunday, May 1

(10) A. J. Johnson 2 vs. (15) Shawn Maldonado 1
Game 1: Johnson wins 226–225
Game 2: Maldonado wins 257–225
Rolloff: Johnson wins 59–40

(6) Tommy Jones 2 vs. (14) Jesper Svensson 1
Game 1: Jones wins 249–218
Game 2: Svensson wins 279–236
Rolloff: Jones wins 60–28

Round 3 (final 4)

Semifinals

Winners (bold type) advance to the Finals; losers earn $30,000.

Sunday, May 8

(5) Kristopher Prather 0 vs. (9) Kyle Troup 2
Game 1: Troup wins 227–212
Game 2: Troup wins 233–215

(6) Tommy Jones 2 vs. (10) A. J. Johnson 1
Game 1: Jones wins 215–193
Game 2: Johnson wins 181–172
Rolloff: Jones wins 48–28

Round 4 (finals)

The 2022 PBA Playoffs finals used a race to three points format.

Sunday, May 15

(6) Tommy Jones 1 vs. (9) Kyle Troup 3
Game 1: Troup wins 217–184
Game 2: Troup wins 276–257
Game 3: Jones wins 279–201
Game 4: Troup wins 288–222

Troup earns $100,000
Jones earns $50,000

References

Professional Bowlers Association